Wagman is a surname. Notable people with the surname include:

 Clinton Wagman (born 1990), South African rugby union player
 Frederick H. Wagman (1912–1994), American librarian, president of the American Library Association
Joey Wagman (born 1991), American-Israeli baseball player
 Nicholas E. Wagman (1905–1980), American astronomer
 Stuart Wagman (1919–2007), American chess master

See also
 Nicholas E. Wagman Observatory of the Amateur Astronomers Association of Pittsburgh
 3110 Wagman, asteroid